Madhumita Kumari is an Indian archer. She won the Silver Medal Asian Games 2018 in the Women's compound archery team event.

References

Living people
Indian female archers
Asian Games medalists in archery
Archers at the 2018 Asian Games
Asian Games silver medalists for India
Medalists at the 2018 Asian Games
Year of birth missing (living people)